Neoterebra incisa is a species of sea snail, a marine gastropod mollusk in the family Terebridae, the auger snails.

Description

Distribution

References

 Faber, M. J. (2007). Marine gastropods from the ABC-islands and other localities. 14. The family Terebridae with the description of a new species from Aruba (Gastropoda: Terebridae). Miscellanea Malacologica. 2: 49–55

Terebridae
Gastropods described in 2007